Milten Draživojević (1332–43) was a Bosnian župan (county lord) in the land of Hum, who is mentioned as serving the Banate of Bosnia between 1332 and 1335 and thereafter the Kingdom of Serbia. He was known for robbing the Republic of Ragusa.

Milten was the son of Dražen Bogopenec (fl. 1306), known from sources as a robber. The family (later known as Bogopanković) was prominent in the early 14th century, although information is scarce. Milten is mentioned for the first time in 1332, as a follower of Bosnian Ban Stephen II. Hum was a border province between Serbia and Bosnia, and became part of Bosnia in the 1320s.

In May 1335, Milten and his relative Vidomir looted Ragusan Manuçe de Mençi in Onogošt (Nikšić). On 24 May 1335, Milten and his son Sanko "from Zagorje" (de Sacorie) are mentioned as Bosnian subjects. The next year, on 5 July 1336, vojvoda Ružir and župan Milten are mentioned as Serbian subjects. In autumn that year, King Stefan Dušan advocated reconciliation between Serbian feudals and the Republic of Ragusa, in which these two restless feudals are prominent.

His son Sanko, a Bosnian magnate, is the eponymous founder of the Sanković family.

Annotations

References

Sources

Books
 
Journals
 
 

14th-century Serbian nobility
People of the Kingdom of Serbia (medieval)
Medieval Serbian magnates
Sanković noble family
People from Nevesinje
People from Kalinovik
Medieval Herzegovina
History of the Serbs of Bosnia and Herzegovina
14th-century Bosnian people